Jean-Marc Ligny (born 13 May 1956) is a French science fiction writer. He began in 1978 and went on to win both the Prix Rosny-Aîné and the Prix Tour Eiffel de Science-Fiction. He has done notable works of cyberpunk and space opera. He is also known for the Les voleurs de rêves series and the award-winning Jihad. In addition to that he wrote an homage to the group Dead Can Dance.

External links
 Official website 

1956 births
French science fiction writers
Living people
Writers from Paris
French male novelists